Czech Lion Award for Best Makeup and Hairstyling is award given to the Czech film with best Makeup and Hairstyling.

Winners

 

Czech Lion Awards
 
Film awards for makeup and hairstyling
Awards established in 2013